"Rock Me" is a song by English singer Melanie C from her fifth solo album, The Sea. It was released as the album's buzz single on 24 June 2011 in Germany. Written by Melanie C, Dave Roth and David Jost, it serves as official theme song for German TV channel ZDF's coverage of the 2011 FIFA Women's World Cup. Melanie C performed this on The Sea – Live tour as the opening song.

Music video
The video premiered two weeks before the release of the single. It was filmed at the Projekts Skatepark in Manchester, UK. It featured Melanie C dancing around in the skate park, and in front of a wall with letters "Rock Me" painted on it. Melanie C was also the choreographer for the music video.

Chart performance
The song debuted and peaked at number 38 in the German Singles Chart, spending only three weeks in the chart.

Formats and track listings 
These are the formats and track listings of major single releases of "Rock Me".

CD single 
"Rock Me" – 3:11
"Stop This Train" – 4:00 

Digital download
"Rock Me" – 3:11
"Stop This Train" – 4:00
"Rock Me"  – 3:29
"Rock Me"  - 3:12

Chart

Release history

References 

2011 singles
Melanie C songs
Songs written by Melanie C
Songs written by David Jost